Portuguese creoles are creole languages which have Portuguese as their substantial lexifier. The most widely-spoken creoles influenced by Portuguese are Cape Verdean Creole, Guinea-Bissau Creole and Papiamento.

Origins 
Portuguese overseas exploration in the 15th and 16th centuries led to the establishment of a Portuguese Empire with trading posts, forts and colonies in Africa, Asia and the Americas. Contact between the Portuguese language and native languages gave rise to many Portuguese-based pidgins, used as linguas francas throughout the Portuguese sphere of influence.  In time, many of these pidgins were nativized, becoming new stable creole languages.

As is the rule in most creoles, the lexicon of these languages can be traced to the parent languages, usually with predominance of Portuguese; 

These creoles are (or were) spoken mostly by communities of descendants of Portuguese, natives, and sometimes other peoples from the Portuguese colonial empire.

Until recently creoles were considered "degenerate" dialects of Portuguese unworthy of attention. As a consequence, there is little documentation on the details of their formation. Since the 20th century, increased study of creoles by linguists led to several theories being advanced. The monogenetic theory of pidgins assumes that some type of pidgin language — dubbed West African Pidgin Portuguese — based on Portuguese was spoken from the 15th to 18th centuries in the forts established by the Portuguese on the West African coast. According to this theory, this variety may have been the starting point of all the pidgin and creole languages. This may explain to some extent why Portuguese lexical items can be found in many creoles, but more importantly, it would account for the numerous grammatical similarities shared by such languages, such as the preposition na, meaning "in" and/or "on", which would come from the Portuguese contraction na, meaning "in the" (feminine singular).

Origin of the name

The Portuguese word for "creole" is crioulo, which derives from the verb criar ("to raise", "to bring up") and a suffix -oulo of debated origin.  Originally the word was used to distinguish the members of any ethnic group who were born and raised in the colonies from those who were born in their homeland.  In Africa it was often applied to locally born people of (wholly or partly) Portuguese descent, as opposed to those born in Portugal; whereas in Brazil it was also used to distinguish locally born black people of African descent from those who had been brought from Africa as slaves.

In time, however, this generic sense was lost, and the word crioulo or its derivatives (like "Creole" and its equivalents in other languages) became the name of several specific Upper Guinean communities and their languages: the Guinean people and their Kriol language, Cape Verdean people and their Kriolu language, all of which still today have very vigorous use, suppressing the importance of official standard Portuguese.

Concise list

Upper Guinea
 Cape Verdean Creole:  Vigorous use, Cape Verde Islands.
 Guinea-Bissau Creole:  Vigorous use. Lingua franca in Guinea-Bissau, also spoken in Casamance, Senegal. Growing number of speakers.
 Papiamento: Official language in Aruba, Bonaire and Curaçao. Although situated in the Caribbean, it belongs to this language family. It has a growing number of speakers. 
Gulf of Guinea
 Angolar: A heavy substrate of Kimbundu, spoken on São Tomé Island, São Tomé and Príncipe.
 Annobonese: Vigorous use. Spoken on Annobón island, Equatorial Guinea
 Forro: Forro is becoming the language of social networks. Spoken on São Tomé Island, São Tomé and Príncipe.
 Principense: Almost extinct. Spoken on Príncipe Island, São Tomé and Príncipe.
Indo-Portuguese
Indo-Portuguese
Indo-Portuguese
Malabar–Sri Lankan Portuguese, grouping Sri Lankan Portuguese, Battilocan Portuguese, Malabar Indo-Portuguese. Spoken in the coastal cities of Sri Lanka and Malabar, India.
Northern Indo-Portuguese
Daman and Diu Portuguese, spoken in Dadra and Nagar Haveli and Daman and Diu, India. (old decreolization)
Korlai Indo-Portuguese, spoken in Korlai, India.
Southeast Asian
Macanese:  Spoken in Macau and Hong Kong, China. (old decreolization)
Malayo-Portuguese
Kristang: spoken in Malaysia and emigrant communities in Singapore and Perth, Western Australia.
Português de Bidau: extinct.

Africa

Upper Guinea
The oldest Portuguese creole are the so-called crioulos of Upper Guinea, born around the Portuguese settlements along the northwest coast of Africa. Portuguese creoles are the mother tongues of most people in Cape Verde. In Guinea-Bissau, the creole is used as lingua franca among people speaking different languages, and is becoming the mother tongue of a growing population. They consist of two languages:

 Guinea Creole (Kriol): lingua franca of Guinea-Bissau, also spoken in Casamance, Senegal and in Gambia.
 Cape Verdean Creole (Kriolu, Kriol): a dialect continuum on the islands of Cape Verde.
  Papiamento (Papiamentu), spoken in Aruba, Bonaire, and Curaçao.

Gulf of Guinea
Another group of creoles is spoken in the Gulf of Guinea, in São Tomé and Príncipe and Equatorial Guinea.

 Angolar (Ngola, N'góla): in coastal areas of São Tomé Island.
 Annobonese (Fa d'Ambu): on Annobón Island.
 Forro: in São Tomé.
 Principense (Lunguyê) (almost extinct): on Príncipe Island.
 Tongas Portuguese (Português dos Tongas): variety of Cape Verdean Creole spoken in São Tomé and Príncipe.

Many other Portuguese creoles probably existed in the former Portuguese feitorias in the Gulf of Guinea, but also in the Congo region.

Portuguese pidgins
Portuguese pidgins still exist in Angola and Mozambique.

South Asia

India

The numerous Portuguese outposts in India and Sri Lanka gave rise to many Portuguese creole languages, of which only a few have survived to the present.  The largest group were the Norteiro languages, spoken by the Norteiro people, the Christian Indo-Portuguese in the North Konkan.  Those communities were centered on Baçaim, modern Vasai, which was then called the “Northern Court of Portuguese India” (in opposition to the "Southern Court" at Goa). The creole languages spoken in Baçaim, Salsete, Thana, Chevai, Mahim, Tecelaria, Dadar, Parel, Cavel, Bandora (modern Bandra), Gorai, Morol, Andheri, Versova, Malvan, Manori, Mazagão, and Chaul are now extinct.  The only surviving Norteiro creoles are:

Daman and Diu Portuguese Creole: in Dadra and Nagar Haveli and Daman and Diu.
Kristi: in Korlai, Maharashtra.

These surviving Norteiro creoles have suffered drastic changes in the last decades. Standard Portuguese re-influenced the creole of Daman in the mid-20th century.

The creoles of the Coast of Coromandel, such as of Meliapor, Madras, Tuticorin, Cuddalore, Karikal, Pondicherry, Tranquebar, Manapar, and Negapatam, were already extinct by the 19th century. Their speakers (mostly the people of mixed Portuguese-Indian ancestry, known locally as Topasses) switched to English after the British takeover.

Most of the creoles of the Coast of Malabar, namely those of Cananor, Tellicherry, Mahé, Cochin (modern Kerala), and Quilon) had become extinct by the 19th century. In Cananor and Tellicherry, some elderly people still spoke some creole in the 1980s. The only creole that is still spoken (by a few Christian families only) is Vypin Indo-Portuguese, in the Vypin Island, near Kerala.

Christians, even in Calcutta, used Portuguese until 1811. A Portuguese creole was still spoken in the early 20th century. Portuguese creoles were spoken in Bengal, such as at Balasore, Pipli, Chandannagore, Chittagong, Midnapore and Hooghly.

Sri Lanka 
Significant Portuguese creoles flourished among the so-called Burgher and Kaffir communities of Sri Lanka:

Sri Lanka Indo-Portuguese: around Batticaloa and Trincomalee (Portuguese Burghers) and Puttalam (Kaffirs).

In the past, Portuguese creoles were also spoken in Myanmar and Bangladesh.

Southeast Asia

The earliest Portuguese creole in the region probably arose in the 16th century in Malacca, Malaysia, as well as in the Moluccas.  After the takeover of those places by the Dutch in the 17th century, many creole-speaking slaves were taken to other places in Indonesia and South Africa, leading to several creoles that survived until recent times:

Kristang (Cristão): in Malacca (Malaysia) and Singapore.
Mardijker (extinct in the 19th century): by the Mardijker people of Batavia (Jakarta) 
Papiá Tugu (extinct in 1978): in Kampung Tugu, Jakarta, Indonesia.
Portugis (extinct around 1950): in the Ambon, Ternate islands and Minahasa, Indonesia
Bidau Portuguese (extinct in the 1960s): in the Bidau area of Dili, East Timor.

The Portuguese were present in the island of Flores, Indonesia since the 16th century, mainly in Larantuka and Sikka; but the local creole language, if any, has not survived.

Other Portuguese creoles were once spoken in Thailand (In Kudi Chin and Conception) and Bayingy in Burma.

Macau
The Portuguese language was present in Portugal's colony Macau since the mid-16th century. A Portuguese creole, Patua, developed there.
Macanese (Macaista, Patuá): in Macau and, to a lesser extent, in Hong Kong.

South America
A few Portuguese creoles are found in South America:

Papiamento is spoken on Aruba, Bonaire, and Curaçao. 
Saramaccan of Suriname. 
Cupópia of Brazil is nearly extinct.

Papiamento (spoken on Aruba, Bonaire and Curaçao in the Caribbean) is closely related to the Upper Guinea Creoles: Guinea-Bissau Creole and especially with Cape Verdean Creole. Papiamento has a Portuguese basis, but has undergone a large Spanish and considerable Dutch influence.

There is no consensus regarding the position of Saramaccan, with some scholars classifying it as Portuguese creole with an English relexification. Saramaccan may be an English creole with Portuguese words, since structurally (morphology and syntax) it is related to the Surinamese creoles (Sranan, Ndyuka and Jamaican Maroon), despite the heavy percentage of Portuguese origin words. Other English creole languages of Suriname, such as Paramaccan or Kwinti, have also Portuguese influences.

Although sometimes classified as a creole, the Cupópia language from the Quilombo do Cafundó, at Salto de Pirapora, São Paulo, discovered in 1978 and spoken by less than 40 people as a secret language, is better classified as a Portuguese variety since it is structurally similar to Portuguese, in spite of having a large number of Bantu words in its lexicon. For languages with these characteristics, H. H. do Couto has forged the designation of anticreole, which would be the inverse of a creole language, as they are seen by the non-European input theories (i.e.: creoles = African languages grammar + European languages lexicon; anticreoles = European languages grammar + African languages lexicon).

There is a Portuguese dialect in Helvécia, South of Bahia that is theorized as presenting signs of an earlier decreolization. Ancient Portuguese creoles originating from Africa are still preserved in the ritual songs of the Afro-Brazilian animist religions (Candomblé).

Brazil
It has been conjectured that the vernacular of Brazil (not the official and standard Brazilian Portuguese) resulted from decreolization of a creole based on Portuguese and native languages; but this is not a widely accepted view. Vernacular Brazilian Portuguese is continuous and mutually intelligible with European Portuguese, and in fact quite conservative in some aspects.
Academic specialists compiled by linguist Volker Noll affirm that the Brazilian linguistic phenomena are the "nativização", nativization/nativism of a most radically Romanic form. The phenomena in Brazilian Portuguese are Classical Latin and Old Portuguese heritage. This is not a creole form, but a radical Romanic form. Regardless of borrowings and minor changes, it must be kept in mind that Brazilian Portuguese is not a Portuguese creole, since both grammar and vocabulary remain "real" Portuguese and its origins can be traced directly from 16th century European Portuguese. Some authors, like Swedish Parkvall, classify it as a semicreole in the concept defined by Holm: a semicreole is a language that has undergone “partial restructuring, producing varieties which were never fully pidginized and which preserve a substantial part of their lexifier’s structure (...) while showing a noticeable degree of restructuring”. Nevertheless, scholars like Anthony Julius Naro and Maria Marta Pereira Scherre demonstrated how every single phenomenon found in Brazilian Portuguese can also be found in regional modern European Portuguese and 1500s and 1600s European Portuguese, such as the epic poetry of Luís de Camões, as well as other Romance languages such as Aranese Occitan, French, Italian and Romanian, classifying these phenomena as a natural Romance drift. Vernacular Brazilian Portuguese is continuous with European Portuguese and its phonetics is more conservative in several aspects, characterizing the nativization of a koiné formed by several regional European Portuguese variations brought to Brazil and its natural drift.

North America
Traces of a Portuguese-based pidgin have also been detected among the enslaved population in New Netherland.

See also
Sri Lankan Portuguese creole
Sabir (language)

Notes

References

Further reading

External links
The Origins of Negation in the Gulf of Guinea Creoles
Reconstructing Kriol syllable structures
The Portuguese Language Heritage in the East
Malacca Portuguese Eurasian Association
Malacca Portuguese Settlement
Singapore Eurasian Association Kristang page
Declaraçon di mundo intêro di Dréto di tudo homi co tudo mudjer Universal Declaration of Human Rights in Kriolu of Santiago
Declaraçom Universal di Diritu di Omis Universal Declaration of Human Rights in Kriol
Declaraçón Universal di Dirêtu di Hómé Universal Declaration of Human Rights in Forro
Dutch Portuguese Colonial History Dutch Portuguese Colonial History
Association for Portuguese and Spanish Lexically Based Creoles (ACBLPE)
Associação Brasileira de Estudos Crioulos e Similares (ABECS)

 
Creole languages, Portuguese-based